Uruppumkutty is a small hamlet in Ayyankunnu Panchayat  Iritty Taluk, Kannur District, Kerala State, India. Uruppumkutty is about 18 km from Iritty.

Economy
Rubber plantations are a major source of income for the local population.

Demographics
The place has a large population of Syrian Catholic Christians.

Transportation
The national highway passes through Kannur town.  Mangalore and Mumbai can be accessed on the northern side and Cochin and Thiruvananthapuram can be accessed on the southern side.  The road to the east of Iritty connects to Mysore and Bangalore.   The nearest railway stations are at Thalassery (Code:TLY) and Kannur (Code:CAN) on Shoranur–Mangalore section. The nearest airports are at Kannur and Kozhikode.

References

Villages near Iritty